The Stromboli class was a group of two vessels designed by Sir William Symonds the Surveyor of the Navy. The design was approved on 29 August 1838. The ships were initially classified as Steam Vessels Second Class (SV2) and were later classified as First Class sloops. The ships were built in two Royal Dockyards (Portsmouth and Sheerness). Both ships were at the bombardment of Acre in 1840. Both were in the Black and Azov seas during the Russian War. They served on various stations of the Empire. Vesuvius was sold in 1865 and Stromboli in 1866. Both were broken by White at East Cowes on the Isle of Wight.

Stromboli was the only named vessel in the Royal Navy.

Vesuvius was the eleventh named vessel (spelt Vesuvius or Vesuve) since it was used for a 8-gun fireship, launched by Taylor of Cuckold's Point on 30 March 1691 and expended on 19 November 1693 at Saint-Malo.

Design and specifications
Both vessels were ordered 12 March 1838 and laid down in September at Portsmouth and Sheerness. The vessels were launched in July (Vesuvius) and August (Stromboli) 1839. The builder's measure was calculated at 965 79/94 tons whereas the vessels displaced 1,283 tons.

Robert Napier & Sons of Govan supplied the machinery for both vessels. They were equipped with two fire-tube rectangular boilers. The engines were 2-cylinder vertical single expansion (VSE) side-lever steam engines rated at 280 nominal horsepower (NHP). Pictures show Vesuvius with a barque rig.

All four ships were initially armed with two 10-inch 84 hundredweight (cwt) shell Millar's original guns on pivot mounts and two 68-pounder 64 cwt muzzle loading smooth bore (MLSB) carronades and two 42-pounder (22 cwt) MLSB carronades on broadside trucks. In 1856 the 10-inch guns were replaced with a Dundas 1853 68-pounder 84 cwt MLSB gun and the carronades were replaced with four 32-pounder 42 cwt MLSB guns on broadside trucks. In the 1860s the 68-pounder was replaced with an Armstrong 7-inch rifled breech loader (RBL) gun. This weapon is also known as the 100/110-pounder gun depending on the weight of shell fired. They had a complement of approximately 149 men and grew to 160 men with the change in armament.

Initial cost of vessels
Stromboli: Total Cost £41,240 (Hull - £19,248; Machinery - £13,280; Fitting - £8,712)
Vesuvius: Total Cost £39,505 (Hull - £21,707; Machinery - £13,309; Fitting - £4,389)

Ships

Notes

Citations

References
 Lyon Winfield, The Sail & Steam Navy List, All the Ships of the Royal Navy 1815 to 1889, by David Lyon & Rif Winfield, published by Chatham Publishing, London © 2004, 
 Winfield, British Warships in the Age of Sail (1817 – 1863), by Rif Winfield, published by Seaforth Publishing, England © 2014, e, Chapter 11 Steam Paddle Vessels, Vessels acquired since November 1830, Stromboli Class
 Colledge, Ships of the Royal Navy, by J.J. Colledge, revised and updated by Lt Cdr Ben Warlow and Steve Bush, published by Seaforth Publishing, Barnsley, Great Britain, © 2020, e  (EPUB)
 The Navy List, published by His Majesty's Stationery Office, London

Paddle sloops of the Royal Navy
Sloop classes